Kisa BK (Kisa Bollklubb) is a Swedish football club located in Kisa, which was founded in 1925 and is still currently based in Kisa, Sweden.

Background
Kisa BK currently plays in Division 4 Östergötland Västra which is the sixth tier of Swedish football. They play their home matches at the Kisa IP in Kisa.

Kisa BK are affiliated to Östergötlands Fotbollförbund.

Season to season

Footnotes

External links
 Kisa BK – Official website
 Kisa BK on Facebook

Sport in Östergötland County
Football clubs in Östergötland County
Association football clubs established in 1925
1925 establishments in Sweden